The 2016–17 CAA men's basketball season marked the 32nd season of Colonial Athletic Association basketball. The season began with practices in October 2016, followed by the start of the 2016–17 NCAA Division I men's basketball season in November. Conference play began in late December and concluded in late February.

On February 23, 2017, UNC Wilmington clinched the regular season CAA championship, their third consecutive CAA championship. The College of Charleston finished in second place.

The CAA tournament was held from March 3–6, 2017 at North Charleston Coliseum in North Charleston, South Carolina. UNC Wilmington defeated College of Charleston to win the tournament championship, their second consecutive tournament championship. As a result, UNC Wilmington received the conference's automatic bid to the NCAA tournament. College of Charleston received a bid to the National Invitation Tournament. Towson was invited to play in the College Basketball Invitational, but declined the invitation.

Head coaches

Coaching changes
On March 7, 2016, Bruiser Flint was fired as head basketball coach after 15 seasons with Drexel. On March 24, 2016, Drexel announced that Zach Spiker was hired to replace Bruiser Flint as head coach.
James Madison, despite finishing with 21 wins, fired head coach Matt Brady on March 14, 2016. He was 139–127 in eight seasons with James Madison. On March 31, 2016, the school hired Louis Rowe, a JMU alum, as head coach.
Delaware Head coach Monté Ross was fired following the season. On May 24, the school hired Martin Ingelsby as his replacement.

Coaches 

Notes: 
 All records, appearances, titles, etc. are from time with current school only. 
 Year at school includes 2016–17 season.
 Overall and CAA records are from time at current school and are through the end of the 2016–17 season.

Preseason

Preseason poll
Source

() first place votes

Preseason Awards
Source

Colonial Athletic Association Preseason Player of the Year:  Chris Flemmings (UNC Wilmington)

Regular season

Conference matrix
This table summarizes the head-to-head results between teams in conference play.

CAA Players of the Week 

 Nov. 14 – T. J. Williams (Northeastern)
 Nov. 21 – Devontae Cacok (UNCW)
 Nov. 28 – Luke Eddy (Elon)
 Dec. 5  – Jarrell Brantley (Charleston), Brian Dawkins (Elon)
 Dec. 12 – Denzel Ingram (UNCW), Rodney Williams (Drexel)
 Dec. 19 – Alex Murphy (Northeastern)
 Dec. 26 – T. J. Williams (Northeastern) (2)
 Jan. 2  – Daniel Dixon (William & Mary)
 Jan. 9  – Joe Chealey (Charleston)
 Jan. 16 – William Adala Moto (Towson), Chris Flemmings (UNCW)
 Jan. 23 – Tyler Seibring (Elon), Justin Wright-Foreman (Hofstra)
 Jan. 30 – Omar Prewitt (William & Mary), Tyler Seibring (Elon) (2)
 Feb. 6  – Daniel Dixon (William & Mary) (2)
 Feb. 13 – Justin Wright-Foreman (Hofstra) (2)
 Feb. 20 – Mike Morsell (Towson)
 Feb. 27 – C. J. Bryce (UNCW)

CAA Rookies of the Week 

 Nov. 14 – Eli Pemberton (Hofstra), Grant Riller (Charleston)
 Nov. 21 – Kurk Lee (Drexel)
 Nov. 28 – Max Boursiquot (Northeastern)
 Dec. 5  – Eli Pemberton (Hofstra)(2)
 Dec. 12 – Ryan Daly (Delaware)
 Dec. 19 – Eli Pemberton (Hofstra)(3)
 Dec. 26 – Kári Jónsson (Drexel)
 Jan. 2  – Ryan Daly (Delaware)(2)
 Jan. 9  – Ryan Daly (Delaware)(3)
 Jan. 16 – Grant Riller (Charleston)(2)
 Jan. 23 – Ryan Daly (Delaware)(4)
 Jan. 30 – Grant Riller (Charleston)(3)
 Feb. 6  – Bolden Brace (Northeastern), Kurk Lee (Drexel)(2)
 Feb. 13 – Ryan Daly (Delaware)(5), Grant Riller (Charleston)(4)
 Feb. 20 – Ryan Daly (Delaware)(6)
 Feb. 27 – Bolden Brace (Northeastern)(2)

CAA honors and awards

Postseason

Colonial Athletic Association Tournament

NCAA tournament

The CAA had one bid to the 2017 NCAA Division I men's basketball tournament, that being the automatic bid of UNC Wilmington by winning the conference tournament.

National Invitation Tournament 

The College of Charleston was invited to play in the 2017 National Invitation Tournament.

References